Marie-Anne-Julie Forestier (Paris, 13 June 1782 - Choisy-le-Roi, 26 February 1853) was a French painter.

Life
Born in Paris, she became a pupil of Jacques-Louis David and in June 1806 became engaged to Jean-Dominique Ingres. However, Ingres left for Rome that September and the engagement did not survive until his return to France, since he won the first prize for painting in 1801 and thus had to stay in Rome.

She exhibited at the Paris Salons of 1802, 1810, 1812, 1814 and 1819. Her works include a portrait of Philippe Pinel with his family and a copy of Ingres' Self-Portrait Aged 24 - the latter is now in the musée Ingres in Montauban.

Bibliography
 Henry Lapauze, Le Roman d'amour de M. Ingres, Paris, 1910, p. 199-242.

Sources
Birth record for Forestier
http://www.latribunedelart.com/julie-forestier-par-ingres---ingres-par-julie-forestier-article00479.html

Painters from Paris
1782 births
1853 deaths
French women painters
19th-century French painters
19th-century French women artists